The Rajarajeshwara temple is a Shiva temple located in Taliparamba in Kannur district of Kerala, India. The temple is regarded as one of the existing 108 ancient Shiva Temples of ancient Kerala. It also has a prominent place amongst the numerous Shiva temples in South India. It had the tallest shikhara amongst the temples of its time. The Rajarajeshwara temple has a top of about 90 tonnes. If any problem is encountered in the other temples of South India, devotees seek a solution in this temple through a prashnam, a traditional method of astrological decision-making. The prashnam is conducted on a peedha (a raised platform) outside the temple.

Legendarily, it was supposedly renovated by Sage Parashurama, long before the Kali Yuga commenced. Several centuries ago, it was renovated by the Mushika (Kolathiri) dynasty kings. This temple was rebuilt into its present form in the early eleventh century. The quadrangular sanctum has a two-tiered pyramidal roof; in front of the sanctum is the namaskara mandapam, but the temple has no kodi maram (flagstaff), unlike others in Kerala. Only Hindus are permitted to enter.

Legends and history

The temple at Taliparamba is among the 108 ancient Kerala temples dedicated to Shiva. It is as famous as the Shiva temples in Vaikom, Ettumanur and Trichur.

Taliparamba is also regarded as one of the ancient Shakti Peethams. Legend has it that the head of Sati (Goddess/ wife of Shiva) fell here after Shiva's tandavam following Sati's self-immolation. Sati was the daughter of Daksh, a respected Hindu king who had a disregard for Shiva.

The Shiva Linga here is believed to be several thousands of years old. Legend has it that Shiva gave 13 sacred Shivalingas to Parvati/Sati to worship. One sage, Maandhata, propitiated Lord Shiva with intense prayers. Shiva was so pleased that he presented one of the Shiva Lingas to him with the injunction that it should be installed only at a place where there was no cremation ground. The sage, after searching all over, found Taliparamba the most sacred spot where he installed the Shiva Linga.

After his death the Linga disappeared into the earth. Then his son Muchukunda offered similar prayers to Shiva and got a second Shiva Linga, which too disappeared in course of time. Centuries passed. The third Shiva Linga was handed down to Satasoman, a king of Mushaka/Kolathiri/Chirakkal Royal Family, who then ruled the region. He was an ardent devotee of Shiva. On the advice of sage Agastya, he prayed to Lord Siva, who granted him the Shiva Linga. The king installed it in the present temple built by him. However, as per many legends associated with the Temple, Agastya Himself installed the Shiva Linga (which is believed as per those legends to be a 'Jyothirlingam').

A major legend about this temple, begins with the visit of the Puranic sage Parashurama, one of the incarnations of Lord Vishnu. Seeing there, an ancient shrine of vibrant spiritual power in a dilapidated condition, the sage was grief-stricken and wanted to know its history. Thereupon, sage Narada appeared there and related to him the story of the temple. According to it, sage Sanaka and others, the sons of the creator Lord Brahma, churned the disk of the Sun to lessen its fierce heat. They mixed the dust, which was formed while churning, with the divine nectar of immortality, Amrita, and out of it gave shape to three spiritually to Lord Brahma presented them to Goddess Parvathi, the consort of Lord Shiva. Goddess Parvathi presented these Shivalingams to three kings who were doing intense austerities to invoke the Goddess, one in the Treta Yuga and the other two in the Dvapara Yuga. Maandhatha was the king to whom the Goddess presented the Shivalingam in the Treta Yuga, and Muchukundam and Shathasoman were the devotees who received the other two lingams in Dvapara Yuga. Goddess Parvathi advised each of them to install the idols in such a place where no death of any creature had taken place or any dead body had fallen. After a long search for such a place, which was very difficult to locate, Maandhatha, the first one to receive the lingam, found out a small place of that description, only that much land which could accommodate a small plate. Thalika in Malayalam means a plate. It is said that the region came to be known as Taliparamba, which means the place large enough to accommodate a Thalika after this legend. Maandhatha installed his Shivalingam at this place.

Eventually this Jyothirlingam disappeared in the earth rendering the place spiritually vibrant forever when the Treta Yuga was over. Then, in Dvapara Yuga, King Muchukundan, after receiving the second Jyothirlingam from Goddess Parvathi as instructed, was also in search for a spot where no death had taken place naturally he also came to the same spot where Maandhatha had installed the first Shivalingam. He installed his Shivalingam at the same spot. This Shivalingam was also eventually dissolved into the earth again reinforcing the spot spiritually. Then came king Shathasoman, the one who received the third Shivalingam. He was also naturally attracted to the same spot and installed his Shivalingam there. While installing, this Lingam also began sinking into the earth. King Shathasoman thereupon prayed for Sage Agastya's help. The sage appeared and after lighting a ghee lamp prostrated before the Shivalingam twelve times; when he began the thirteenth prostration, the Lingam got firmly fixed on the earth — therefore the number of prostrations the Sage Agastya performed for his purpose came to be known as twelve and a half. Thus, with the installation of the third Shivalingam the sacred spot became spiritually vibrant threefold.

Hearing this story from sage Narada, devotion welled up in the heart of sage Parashurama, and he decided to renovate the temple for the welfare of mankind. As desired by the sage, the celestial architect Ari Vishwakarma performed the renovation work. During the final stage of the renovation, sage Agastya appeared on the scene and, after making abhishekam (ablution) on the idol, lighted a ghee lamp. This lamp has shone continuously ever since, with a regular supply of ghee. Offering of ghee in gold, silver and copper pitchers with intense devotion is an important offering for the lord.

It is believed that Sri Rama during his victorious return from Lanka stopped here to offer worship to Lord Shiva. In honor of His presence, devotees are not allowed into the namaskara mandapam even today.

Lord Shiva, as worshiped in this sacred temple, is known as Sree Rajarajeswara, which means the Emperor of Emperors — the Lord Supreme. The name signifies the supreme transcendental power in the background of mysterious drama of the boundless universe. That power is invoked here as Lord Rajarajeshwara. Devotees address the lord with such royal appellations as Perumthrikovilappan, Perum-chelloorappan and Thampuraan Perumthrikkovilappan.

The Jyothirlingam in the shrine in vibrant with spiritual power that exerts an enriching influence both on the material and spiritual levels of the earnest devotees. The celebrated ancient sage Agastya Maharishi is associated with the installation of the Jyothirlingam in the shrine.

The legends of temples are usually symbolic in character and are intended to convey deep messages to the spiritual inquirer and instill faith in the common man. The legends of Sri Rajarajeshwara Temple reveal the antiquity and the special significance of the Spiritual Presence.

Temple legends are highly symbolic representations of the subtle spiritual principles and highlight the nature and intensity of the spiritual presence at a particular place. They instill devotion and convey their deeper message to the spiritual seeker. The above-mentioned legend highlights the fact that at this unique centre of spiritual power discovered and maintained by the great sages of yore, one can receive profound Divine grace for material progress and spiritual enlightenment.

Traditional way of visiting
According to the traditional system of visiting this temple, the devotee first worships Lord Krishna at the shrine of Vasudevapuram on the southern bank of the vast temple tank known as Aashraamath-chira, where there is a beautiful idol of Krishna playing the flute. The sweet melody from Krishna's flute symbolizes the supreme spiritual harmony that prevails in the background of the universe of diversities, which one can experience by spiritually elevating oneself. Worship of Krishna before entering the great temple of Shiva symbolizes the essential unity of Lord Vishnu and Lord Shiva as two aspects of the same Supreme Being. There are other special features in this temple that highlight this unity. It is believed that there was an ashram of sage Agastya on the bank of this temple tank. The tank was reconstructed in the present stage, it is believed about 460 years ago, by a devotee named Chittoor Namboodiripad.

Then, proceeding towards Sree Rajarajeswara temple one worships at the shrine of Sree Bhoothanatha (Kumbhodhara), who is the chief lieutenant of lord Shiva. Kumbhodhara is also known as Aravathappan. Sri Krishna and Sri Bhoothanatha are considered the accompanying deities of lord Rajarajeswara.

The temple covers a spacious compound of about eight acres surrounded by a compound wall with two gopurams on the eastern and western sides. The ancient compound wall is a wondrous architectural marvel built of huge cut stones placed one above the other without any cementing mortar, broad at the base and tapering towards the top.

The main gate is on the east before one enters the temple; one turns eastwards and offers prayers to Lord Vaidyanatha (kanhirangaatt-appan), an aspect of lord Shiva worshiped as the lord of physicians, enshrined in temple about 6 km from Rajarajeswara temple.

Entering the shrine

On entering the eastern gate the devotee circumambulates the whole central shrine before stepping inside. Towards the northern side there is a small shrine of a guardian deity called Yakshi. Usually a Yakshi is considered to be a female spirit with malevolent propensities, but the Yakshi installed here represents a prosperity-giving and benevolent spiritual power. The figure is a life-size wooden sculpture of unique charm. The Yakshi is represented as looking intently into a mirror.

After worshiping this guardian deity, the devotee proceeds towards the front of the central shrine and worships the Rishabha, the bull (mount of lord Shiva) outside the central shrine facing the lord. Near Rishabha is the Balikkallu of huge proportions, made of granite with many figurines and intricate carvings.

While circumambulating the Naalambalam (the outer structure around Sree Kovil, the sanctum sanctorum), one walk towards the left side and from the Nirarithikonam (south-west corner) worships Goddess Annapoorneshwari of the famous shrine in Cherukunnu, a few kilometers away. It is believed that the Goddess at Cherukunnu married to Lord Rajarajeswara. Standing on the west one worships Goddess Bhadrakaali enshrined in a renowned shrine of divine mother in Maadaayikkavu. Originally, it is said that goddess Bhadrakaali was worshiped in the western Gopuram of Sri Rajarajeswara temple and later the idol was taken and installed in the shrine at Maadaayikkavu.

After making the circumambulation outside the Nalambalam the devotee enters the inner space around the sanctum sanctorum to worship Lord Rajarajeswara's Jyothirlingam. As usual in the temples of lord Shiva, the circumambulation is performed only up to the theertha-channel, and it is completed with a reverse circumambulation up to the channel.

As per custom, only men enter the Naalambalam during the daytime, while women standing outside. Women can enter the Naalambalm any day after the Athazha pooja is over in the evening. It is assumed that after Athazha pooja the lord is in an aspect of a very pleased and gracious disposition accompanied by his consort goddess Parvathi and his sons Ganesha and Subrahmanya — this is considered to be the most auspicious time for women to enter the Naalambalam as they get the occasion to worship the divine couple.

Architectural splendour
The sanctum sanctorum with its majestic proportions is a fine example of Kerala temple architectural style. The two-tiered sanctum sanctorum is rectangular with copper sheets on the roof. The roof tapers to culminate in a beautiful gold Kalasham.

The sanctum sanctorum has four doors, one on each side. The doors on the east and south only are opened. The eastern doors opens to the presence of lord Rajarajeshwara, represented by the majestic Jyothirlingam. An array of ghee lamps dangle on both sides of the Jyothirlingam. The Bhadradeepam, a ghee lamp lighted by sage Agastya, the most auspicious lamp with a conspicuous flame is seen on the left side of the Jyothirlingam. On the floor there are rows of silver nilavilakku the ghee lamps, on both sides of the Jyothirlingam.

Most of the time the Jyothirlingam is decorated with the insignia of lord Shiva — the thrinethrams — the three eyes, the crescent moon and the Nagaphanam. In the background is a golden Prabha and above is a Vyaalimukham, the face of a mythical being. A Balibimbam or Uthsavamoorthi, which represents the Jyothirlingam, and taken out for worship during special ceremonies, is placed in front. These are jointly decorated with an embossed golden sheet, pure gold ornaments, and with a Navarathna pendant of precious stones.

Only on two occasions every day one can have the direct sight of the Jyothirlingam. In the early morning, at 5.30, during Nirmalyam, when the decorations of the previous day are removed for the first abhishekam, the devotee can have the direct darshanam of the Jyothirlingam which is covered on the top with a golden cup called Golaka. The base of the Jyothirlingam is also covered with a gold sheet. This Nirmalya darshanam is known as Kani, which is very auspicious. One can also directly see the Jyothirlingam again at 9.30 AM when the decorations are removed again after the third pooja of the day for the Navakaabhishekam, also known as kalashaabhishekam.

The door on the southern side of the sanctum sanctorum is also opened. At this seat is lord Shiva is worshiped as Sri Dakshinamoorthi, the first preceptor. There is no idol here but a mural painting of Sri Dakshinamoorthi. On the south-western side, a shrine for Lord Ganesha, the son of Lord Shiva, is also present. Another shrine at the north-western side houses Lord Subrahmanya, another son of Lord Shiva.

Splendour of prosperity
On the west of the sanctum sanctorum is the seat of divine mother Parvathi, the consort of lord Shiva. The door here is permanently closed. There is a symbolic legend regarding the permanent closure. This legend is related to the active presence of both Shiva and Vishnu aspects of reality in this shrine.

Like many a temple legend this aspect is symbolized by a very personalized legend relating to lord Shiva and lord Vishnu through an interesting story. According to it, once Goddess Mahalakshmi, consort of lord Vishnu, came to the shrine to pay obeisance to lord Rajarajeshwara. On seeing the arrival of Mahalakshmi, the lord decided that there should be her prosperity — bestowing presence in the shrine. Therefore, the lord immediately assumed the form of Mahavishnu and goddess Mahalakshmi entered the sanctum sanctorum presuming that it was her lord and sat beside him. And only when lord Shiva assumed his original form did Mahalakshmi realize the mistake. After paying her respects to the lord, she was about to make a hurried exit through the back door when lord Shiva ordered his attendants, the Bhoothaganas, to permanently close the door on western side at the seat of goddess Parvathi so that the aspect of material prosperity which goddess Mahalakshmi represented should be vibrant in the shrine for the benefit of worshipers.

Later, when lord Vishnu arrived at the temple in search of his consort, lord Shiva's attendants prayed to him to allow the presence of goddess Lakshmi the benefit of devotees, which lord Vishnu gladly conceded to before taking his consort with him.

The legend thus signifies in a way interesting to the common people the special message that the spiritual presence in the shrine benefits the devotees for their material and spiritual well being. Signifying this combination of the Shaiva and Vaishnava aspects in the shrine, twice a year, during Shivaratri and Vishnu, the Uthsavamoorthi of the nearby renowned Srikrishna temple of Trichambaram is ceremoniously brought to Sri Rajarajeshwara temple.

The place Taliparamba is also known as Lakshmipuram, and it is believed that the name is related to this legend. In some hymns to lord Rajarajeshwara the lord is also addressed as the Aishwarya prabhu, the lord of prosperity and Lakshmi Puraadheeshwaran the lord of Lakshmipuram.

Uniqueness
According to Hindu philosophy, Lord Vishnu symbolizes the aspect of maintenance of the universe and lord Shiva its dissolution. Both these aspects are represented in the Jyothirlingam in this shrine and therefore the lord is called Rajarajeshwara, the lord supreme.

Because of the combination of these aspects there are deviations in the mode of worship of lord Shiva here. Here the lord is worshiped in the most transcendental aspect of Shiva known as Sadaashiva. Unlike in other Shiva temple where the Bilwa leaf is an important item for worship, it is not used here for the poojas, instead the Tulsi leaf is used. The Rudrabhishekam, which is common in most of the Shiva temples is not performed here. Instead of Monday, Wednesday is the important day of worship here. Unlike in other Shiva temples pradosham is not observed with special significance here. There is no dhaara, the constant pouring of holy water, for the lingam here in other Shiva temple. Some of the other distinctive features of this shrine are there is no Dwajasthambha here and there is no annual festival or ritualistic annual bath. The deity is never taken outside of the precincts of the temple.

On the northern side of the sanctum sanctorum is the sea of sage Parashurama. The door here also remains always closed. Daily five poojas are performed in this temple as in all Mahaakshetras. Early morning at 5.30 the floral decorations of the previous day are removed and Abhishekam takes place with the sacred water ceremoniously brought from a well-guarded sacred temple tank considered to be the Ganga theertham, specially maintained for this purpose. After the Abhishekam around 6 am the deity is adorned with flower garlands. This is locally known as the poochaarthal. The first pooja called natravat is around 7.30 am. The next pooja called pantheeradi pooja is around 9 am. After this, the decorations are removed and the Kalashaabhishekam with sanctified water is performed before the next pooja called Navaka pooja. The Navaka pooja is performed at the Mandapam, in front of the Srikovil. In most of the major temples this second Abhishekam and Navaka pooja are performed only on special auspicious days. In this temple these rituals are conducted every day. The next pooja, the Uchha pooja is performed at 10am and the Mahaa Naivedyam is offered.

Offerings
Devotees offer Neyy-amrita and Neyy-vilakku and pattrom all these poojas. Ponnumkudam and Vellikkudam, filled with ghee, are offered from Natravat pooja onwards. Special prostrations knew as Yaamanamaskaaram and Ashwamedha namaskar with appropriate mantras from Rigveda are very important offerings for the lord. However, prostrations to the lord are not made at the namaskara mandapam. According to a legend, Sri Rama on his return from Lanka to Ayodhya prayed at this temple and offered prostrations to the lord at this namaskara mandapam, and to commemorate this great event thereafter no one has made prostrations in the mandapam. Devotees receive Thulasi and Vibudhi as the prasaadam. Thaali, the wedding pendant, is an important offering for goddess Parvathi. Turmeric powder is the prasaadam of the goddess.

With Uchha pooja, the morning poojas are over and the temple will be closed at 12 PM. The temple opens again at 5 PM. The Deepaaraadhana is performed according to sunset timings. The last pooja, the Athazha pooja, takes place at 8 PM.

There are four Thanthris belonging to four Illams such as Poonthottathil Pudayoor Mana, Eruvesi Pudayoor Mana Edavalath Pudayoor Mana and Naduvath Pudayoor Mana. The present Thatris are Brahmasri P.P. Vasudevan Namboodiri, Brahmasri P.P. Pandurangan Namboodiri, Brahmasri E.P. Harijayandan Namboodiri, Brahmasri E.P. Kuberan Namboodiripad and Brahmasri N.P. Vasudevan Namboodiri

Shivarathri is the important and auspicious day celebrated with festivities. Several special poojas are performed on this occasion and the Balibimbam is carried on a caparisoned elephant and taken around the temple premises with the accompaniment of instrumental music and the recital of hymns. The Uthsava Bimbam of lord Krishna of the Trichambaram Sri Krishna temple will also be brought here and the Sankaranaarayana pooja, the worship of a combined form of lord Shiva and lord Vishnu will be performed.

Vishu, the auspicious day, which is considered to be the beginning of the original Malayalam year, will be celebrated from the previous evening, and at the night the presence of lord Krisnha of Thrichabaram temple will also be there for a few hours. Seeing the Vishnukani is very auspicious, which will have a protective influence for the whole year.

Puthari, a festival of the harvesting season, Karkadaka Sankramam (July) and Nira are other important days specially celebrated in the temple.

The Rajas of Chirakkal (by which name the Kolathiri Family has been known since they shifted their capital to Chirakkal in 858 CE) have been pious devotees of Sri Rajarajeshwara and some touching incidents are told relating to the intensity of their devotion. The Maharajas of Travancore used to make an offering of an elephant to the temple before ascending the throne (It is worth noting that both Kolathiri and Travancore are branches of the Velir clan, originally from the Thiruvananthapuram area, descending from the ancient Ay/Venad family. Kolathiri and Travancore have since as two sister dynasties reciprocally adopted heirs from each other several times over the centuries). The Zamorin of Kozhikode was also an ardent devotee of this deity.

A revealing incident is mentioned about the celebrated logician of the fifteenth century, Uddhanda, Shastrikal, who considering himself as the worshipper of the attributeless reality, Nirguna Brahmam only, never used to fold his hands in salutations to any deity, a personalized representation of reality. When he happened to come to this temple and stood before the sanctum sanctorum, unknowingly as if by magic his arms folded and the palms closed together in obeisance to the lord, which in his own words "like a lotus flower closes itself on seeing the moon."

The temple has a tradition of bestowing honours, by giving a golden wrist-band and title by the chief priest, to outstanding people in their respective fields of work. Many persons in various fields have been awarded such honours.

Today, to this great shrine of lord Rajarajeshwara arrive many people the world over to worship the Lord and to seek his blessings in their endeavours and professions and for the spiritual fulfillment of life.

Religious customs and rites

The place is considered as most sacred for performing  Koodiyattam and Chakyar Koothu. Whenever a new Koodiyattam is being directed, it is first performed at this temple. Only the "Mani (Māni)" family of Chakyars solely possess the right of performing Koodiyattam here. Legendary Koodiyattam & Chakyar koothu maestro, Nātyāchārya Vidūshakaratnam Padma Shri Māni Mādhava Chākyār had performed here for many decades. The title "Vidūshakaratnam" was awarded to him from this temple.

One of the greatest appreciations or awards that an artist/scholar can get is the "Veerashringhala" (Vīrasringhala or Golden Bracelet), from the temple, given by the unanimous approval of the scholar body of the temple. Guru Mani Madhava Chakyar is the youngest and last person to get the Vīrasringhala from here. Small pots of ghee are offered to the presiding deity Shiva and are placed on steps leading to the sanctum. These are called Neyyamrithu in Malayalam. Men are allowed to enter the shrine at any time, but women are allowed only after 8 PM.

Though it is not practised as widely as it was in the earlier days, it is still a religious custom among many local Hindu women to visit three prominent temples in Taliparamba when they are pregnant. It is believed that Shiva at Rajarajeshwara temple assures the child a high status, Sri Krishna of Trichambaram bestows it with good nature and mental qualities and the deity at Kanjirangad temple gives the child long life.

Popular visitors
 Karnataka former chief minister Yeddyurappa visited here several times. He donated an elephant to this temple during one of his visits.
 Tamil Nadu former chief minister Jayalalithaa had a special relation with this temple.
 BJP president Amit Shah

Controversies
In July 2006, Malayalam actress Meera Jasmine, a Christian, was found to have visited the temple despite the fact that non-Hindus are banned from entry. She later apologised and offered to pay money to perform purification rituals.

See also
 Taliparamba
 Trichambaram Temple
 Kapalikkulangara Sree Mahavishnu Temple 
 Madayi Kavu
 Kalarivathukkal Bhagavathy Temple

References

External links

 Taliparamba Rajarajeswara Temple
 Satellite images of Rajarajeshwara Temple
 Summary of Brihadeshwara Temple

Taliparamba
Hindu temples in Kannur district
Shiva temples in Kerala
108 Shiva Temples